The Church of the Lord Jesus Christ, or Church of the Lord Jesus Christ of the Apostolic Faith is a Oneness Pentecostal multi-campus church, with its headquarters located in Philadelphia, Pennsylvania.

Founded in 1919 by the late Bishop Sherrod C. Johnson, the church grew into a network of church locations steming from New England to Florida and as far west as California. After Johnson's death in early 1961, the movement continued to grow under the ministry of the late Bishop S. McDowell Shelton, gaining international recognition while continuing to maintain a solid base in the United States.

The current leader is Bishop Kenneth "Omega" Shelton.

References

External links
Official website

Related/Split organizations
The Holy Temple Church of the Lord Jesus Christ of the Apostolic Faith
The Whole Truth Church of the Lord Jesus Christ of the Apostolic Faith
First Church of Our Lord Jesus Christ of the Apostle's Faith
Apostolic Ministries of America

Christian organizations established in 1919
Oneness Pentecostal denominations
Christian denominations established in the 20th century
1919 establishments in Pennsylvania